Girona FC made their debut in La Liga for the first time following their promotion from the Segunda Division. The team also participated in the Copa del Rey.

Squad

Transfers
List of Spanish football transfers summer 2017#Girona

In

Out

Competitions

Overall

Liga

League table

Matches

Copa del Rey

Round of 32

Statistics

Appearances and goals
Last updated on 23 December 2017.

|-
! colspan=14 style=background:#dcdcdc; text-align:center|Goalkeepers

|-
! colspan=14 style=background:#dcdcdc; text-align:center|Defenders

|-
! colspan=14 style=background:#dcdcdc; text-align:center|Midfielders

|-
! colspan=14 style=background:#dcdcdc; text-align:center|Forwards

|-
! colspan=14 style=background:#dcdcdc; text-align:center| Players who have made an appearance or had a squad number this season but have left the club

|-
|}

Cards
Accounts for all competitions. Last updated on 22 December 2017.

Clean sheets
Last updated on 22 December 2017.

References

Girona FC seasons
Girona FC
Girona